Peter Quenneville (born March 9, 1994) is a Canadian professional ice hockey forward who is currently playing for Storhamar Hockey in Fjordkraftligaen (Nor)

Playing career
Quenneville played junior hockey initially with the Sherwood Park Crusaders in the Alberta Junior Hockey League (AJHL) before moving to the United States Hockey League to play with the Dubuque Fighting Saints. Quenneville was drafted by the Columbus Blue Jackets in the seventh round, 195th overall, in the 2013 NHL Entry Draft.

After two seasons playing primarily in the ECHL with the Rapid City Rush, on June 19, 2021, Quenneville again embarked on a career abroad, agreeing to a one-year contract with German second tiered club, Lausitzer Füchse, of the DEL2. In the season 2021-22 for the German team he was topscorer of the DEL2 and signs for the next 2 years a contract with the Norway first tiered team Storhamar Ishockey.

Personal life
His younger brother John was drafted 30th overall by the New Jersey Devils in the 2014 NHL Entry Draft, and his youngest brother  was drafted 200th overall in the 2016 NHL Entry Draft. Former NHL head coach Joel Quenneville is his first cousin, once-removed. New York Islanders defenceman Johnny Boychuk is his uncle by marriage.

Career statistics

Awards and honours

References

External links
 

1994 births
Living people
Aalborg Pirates players
Brandon Wheat Kings players
Canadian ice hockey forwards
Cincinnati Cyclones (ECHL) players
Columbus Blue Jackets draft picks
Dubuque Fighting Saints players
HC Dynamo Pardubice players
Lake Erie Monsters players
Quinnipiac Bobcats men's ice hockey players
Rapid City Rush players
Rockford IceHogs (AHL) players
SaiPa players
Sherwood Park Crusaders players
Sparta Warriors players
Ice hockey people from Edmonton
Canadian expatriate ice hockey players in the Czech Republic
Canadian expatriate ice hockey players in Denmark
Canadian expatriate ice hockey players in Norway
Canadian expatriate ice hockey players in Finland
Canadian expatriate ice hockey players in the United States
Canadian expatriate ice hockey players in Germany
Lausitzer Füchse players
Storhamar Dragons players